Yalfan (also Romanized as Yalfān; also known as Yalpān) is a village in Alvandkuh-e Sharqi Rural District, in the Central District of Hamadan County, Hamadan Province, Iran. At the 2006 census, its population was 536, in 174 families.

References 

Populated places in Hamadan County